Abel Meeropol (February 10, 1903 – October 29, 1986) was an American songwriter and poet whose works were published under his pseudonym, Lewis Allan. He wrote the poem "Strange Fruit" (1937), which was recorded by Billie Holiday. Meeropol was a member of the American Communist Party, but later quit.

Biography

Early life
Meeropol was born in 1903 to Russian Jewish immigrants in The Bronx, New York City. Meeropol graduated from DeWitt Clinton High School in 1921 (his classmate Countee Cullen graduated in 1922); he earned a B.A. degree from City College of New York, and an M.A. from Harvard. He taught English at DeWitt Clinton High School for 17 years. During his tenure he taught the notable author and racial justice advocate James Baldwin.

Song writing and poetry
Meeropol wrote the anti-lynching poem "Strange Fruit" (1937), which was first published as "Bitter Fruit" in a Teachers Union publication. He later set it to music. The song was recorded and performed by Billie Holiday and Nina Simone among other artists. Holiday notes in the book Lady Sings the Blues that she co-wrote the music to the song with Meeropol and Sonny White.

Meeropol wrote numerous poems and songs, including the Frank Sinatra and Josh White hit "The House I Live In." He also wrote the libretto of Robert Kurka's opera The Good Soldier Schweik, which was premiered in 1958 by the New York City Opera.

According to his adopted son Robert Meeropol, the songs "Strange Fruit" and "The House I Live In," along with the Peggy Lee hit "Apples, Peaches and Cherries," provided most of the royalty income of the family. "Apples, Peaches and Cherries" was translated into French by Sacha Distel and became a number one hit in France under the title "Scoubidou." Abel Meeropol filed a copyright infringement lawsuit over Distel's plagiarism, as at first Distel had claimed the song as his. After the case was settled, Meeropol started receiving the royalties.

Meeropol published his work under the pseudonym of "Lewis Allan" in memory of the names of his two stillborn children.

Personal life
Meeropol was a communist and sympathetic to Julius and Ethel Rosenberg. Later, he and his wife Anne adopted the Rosenbergs' two sons, Michael and Robert, who were orphaned after their parents' executions for espionage. Michael and Robert took the surname Meeropol.

Death
Meeropol died October 30, 1986, at the Jewish Nursing Home in Longmeadow, Massachusetts.

References

External links
 PBS
 News Reel
 

1903 births
1986 deaths
City College of New York alumni
American communists
Jewish American songwriters
Songwriters from New York (state)
Jewish American writers
20th-century American poets
20th-century American musicians
American people of Russian-Jewish descent
American writers of Russian descent
Harvard University alumni
20th-century pseudonymous writers